Mohamed Amine Kalem (born 27 January 1982) is an Italian-Tunisian para table tennis player who competes in international level events. He is a Paralympic bronze medalist and a European silver medalist.

Kalem was born with a shortened left leg.

References

External links
 

1982 births
Living people
Paralympic table tennis players of Italy
Table tennis players at the 2016 Summer Paralympics
Medalists at the 2016 Summer Paralympics
Tunisian emigrants to Italy
Italian sportspeople of African descent
Table tennis players at the 2020 Summer Paralympics
Italian male table tennis players